Sidcup is an area of south-east London, England, primarily in the London Borough of Bexley. Before the creation of Greater London in 1965, it was in the historical county of Kent.

The name is thought to be derived from  meaning "seat shaped or flat topped hill"; it had its earliest recorded use in 1254. The population of Sidcup, including its neighbourhoods Foots Cray, North Cray, Albany Park, Longlands, Ruxley, Blackfen and Lamorbey, was 43,109 in 2011.

History

Origins 

Sidcup originated as a tiny hamlet on the road from Maidstone to London. According to Edward Hasted, "Thomas de Sedcopp was owner of this estate in the 35th year of king Henry VI. [i.e. in the 1450s] as appears by his deed." Hasted described Sidcup in the latter part of the 18th century as "a small street of houses, among which is an inn of much resort", referring to the former Black Horse pub on the high street.

Sidcup parish formed the Sidcup Urban District of Kent from 1908. It was initially known as Foots Cray; however, in 1921 the urban district, and in 1925 the parish, were renamed Sidcup. The parish and district were abolished in 1934 and combined with Chislehurst to form the Chislehurst and Sidcup civil parish and urban district. In 1965 the parish and urban district were abolished. Sidcup went on to form part of the London Borough of Bexley in Greater London and Chislehurst formed part of the London Borough of Bromley.

Recent 
A number of manor houses, converted to other uses, remain. They include Frognal House, the birthplace and residence of Thomas Townshend, 1st Viscount Sydney, converted for use as residential and nursing accommodation; Lamorbey House, now used by Rose Bruford College; Sidcup Place, a bar and restaurant; and The Hollies, converted for residential use.

Area 
Sidcup borders Blackfen to the north, Albany Park to the northeast and east, Foots Cray to the south-east, Chislehurst to the south and south-west, New Eltham to the west and Avery Hill to the north-west.

Sidcup has a mixture of large Victorian and Edwardian properties alongside typical 1930s suburbia. It retains many parks and open spaces hinting at the great estates and large homes which once stood in the area.

The town contains Queen Mary's Hospital, a large Leisure Centre, four colleges and three secondary schools. Sidcup High Street is the main retail and commercial street, and there are some other shops and local businesses on the adjacent Station Road. In 2014, Sidcup High Street was the subject of a £1.8 million regeneration scheme In Store For Sidcup paid for by London Borough of Bexley.

Most of the district is within the London Borough of Bexley, however, several parts in the North are under the governance of the Royal Borough of Greenwich, including Southspring, Greenhithe Close, Halfway Street (offsite Avery Hill), Radfield Way, Croyde Close and Overmead.

Geography

Demographics 

In 2011 The total population was recorded as 10,844. Many residents are aged 65+ or 85+, in line with the whole of London Borough of Bexley. At the census of 2011, the non-white population of Sidcup was recorded at 10.1%; the largest minority group were Asian or Asian British (5.4% of the total population), with White Other totalling 4.8% of the total population. The number of single parent families was higher in the district in comparison to the rest of the London Borough of Bexley. 63.8% reported Christianity as their religious beliefs which was above the borough average. However, these figures do not include the Blackfen and Lamorbey wards within the district.

Education 

Primary schools in Sidcup include: Birkbeck, Burnt Oak Junior School, Chatsworth, Days Lane, Holy Trinity Lamorbey, Longlands, Orchard School, Our Lady of the Rosary, Royal Park, Sherwood Park, and St Peter Chanel.

Secondary schools in Sidcup include Chislehurst and Sidcup Grammar School, Blackfen, Cleeve Park, Hurstmere and Kemnal Technology College.

Bird College, Christ the King: St Mary's (RC) Sixth Form College, and Rose Bruford College all have sites in Sidcup.

Sport and leisure 
Sidcup has a Non-League football club Sporting Club Thamesmead F.C. who play at the Sporting Club Thamesmead. On Sydney Road, there is a Sidcup Sports Club, housing the local rugby and cricket clubs.

Sidcup also has a Leisure Centre on Hurst Road with 2 pools and a gym.

The Sidcup and District Motor Cycle Club was formed at the Station Hotel, Sidcup in 1928. The club owns the Canada Heights motorcycle sport venue in Button Street, Swanley.

Culture, identity and community 

Sidcup is home to the Rose Bruford College of drama and Bird College, both of which have several famous alumni, and the Sidcup Symphony Orchestra, which also serves the wider South East London area. In an interview with Lake Bell (who studied at Rose Bruford College) in 2015, comedian James Corden described Sidcup as "the armpit of England" on his late night American chat show The Late Late Show with James Corden.

The murder of teenager Rob Knox at the Metro Bar on Station Road in 2008 was national headline news. Knox was an aspiring actor who had, just before his death, filmed a small part in Harry Potter and the Half-Blood Prince. He was killed protecting his brother from a group of youths. His murderer, Karl Bishop, also from Sidcup, was later found guilty of murder and sentenced. Following Knox's death, his family have campaigned to end knife crime among young people. The Rob Knox Foundation has organised a Rob Knox Film Festival in Sidcup and the neighbouring town of Bexleyheath, and a bench was dedicated to Knox at St John's Church in Sidcup in 2015.

Transport

National Rail 
Sidcup railway station opened in October 1866, a month after the opening of the Dartford Loop Line on 1 September 1866. It is 1 mile (1.6 km) north of Sidcup town centre. The station provides the area with Southeastern services to London Charing Cross and to Gravesend.

Roads 
Sidcup High Street is on the A211, following in length the old London – Maidstone – Hythe road. The A211 starts just after Eltham High Street, in the middle running along the A20 Sidcup By-pass before ending at Foots Cray, where the B2173 continues along the former A20 road. The A211 connects the two main roads in this district; Station Road and Main Road.

East Rochester Way on the A2 road runs partly through the district, adjoining Blackfen Road. The road provides links to the Blackwall Tunnel and Kent.

Buses 
Sidcup is served by a number of Transport for London bus routes, namely the 51, 160, 229, 233, 269, 286, 321, 492, 625, 669, B14 and R11. These connect Sidcup with areas including Bexleyheath, Bromley, Catford, Crayford, Chislehurst, Dartford, Eltham, Greenwich, Erith, Lewisham, New Cross, Orpington, Swanley, Thamesmead, Welling & Woolwich.

Notable residents 

 F. Matthias Alexander (1869–1955), Australian actor and inventor of the Alexander technique, lived in Penhill House, Sidcup, for 30 years
 Harry Arter (1989–) footballer (Bournemouth F.C. and Republic of Ireland), born in Sidcup
 Steve Backley (1969–), Olympic javelin silver medallist, born in Sidcup
 Gareth Bacon, politician and leader of the Conservative Party in the Greater London Assembly
 Sam Bailey (1977–), winning contestant, The X Factor, grew up in Sidcup
 Angela Barnes (1976–) actress, stand-up comedienne, born in Sidcup
 Michael Barnard, (1976–) darts player, lived in Sidcup
 Christopher Battarbee (1975–), cricketer (Oxford University), born in Sidcup
 Lake Bell (1979–), American actress, lived in Sidcup while studying at Rose Bruford College in the 1990s.
 Doreen Bird (1928–2004), dance teacher, lived in Sidcup and established Bird College
 Quentin Blake (1932–), illustrator, artist, born in Sidcup
 Denis Bond (1946–), children's author, actor and scriptwriter, lives in Sidcup
 Tom Burns (1944–), Catholic bishop, lived and ministered in Sidcup and taught at St Mary's School in the 1970s
 Garry Bushell (1955–), journalist, lives in Sidcup
 George Albert Cairns (1913–44), recipient of the last Victoria Cross of World War II, lived and worked in Sidcup
 Sheila Callender (1914–2004), haematologist, born in Sidcup
 Ben Chorley (1982–), footballer (Tranmere Rovers, Leyton Orient, now Bromley F.C.), born in Sidcup
 Charlie Clements (1987–), actor (EastEnders), born in Sidcup
 Jason Crowe (1978–), footballer, born in Sidcup
 Jay Darlington (1968-), musician (former keyboardist for the band Kula Shaker and currently a member of the band Magic Bus), born in Sidcup
 Ian Davenport (1966–), abstract painter and former Turner Prize nominee, born in Sidcup
 Douglas Harries (1893–1972), Royal Air Force air vice-marshal and first-class cricketer
 Joe Healy (1986–), footballer who previously played in the Football League for Millwall, born in Sidcup
 Deren Ibrahim (1991–), Gibraltarian footballer, born in Sidcup
 Alfred Garth Jones (1872–1955), illustrator, spent the last years of his life in Sidcup
 John Paul Jones (1946–), bass guitarist (Led Zeppelin), born in Sidcup
 Rob Knox (1989–2008), actor, murdered in Sidcup
Douglas Macmillan (1884–1969), founder of Macmillan Cancer Support, lived in Knoll Road from 1924 until 1966, and also ran his charity from that address. Bexley Civic Society placed a blue plaque on the house in 2010
 Ivan Magill (1888–1986), innovative anaesthetist, worked in Sidcup
 Lee Murray (1977–), former kickboxer and mixed martial arts champion, convicted of the Securitas depot robbery, lived in Sidcup
 Emma Noble (1971–), model and actress, born in Sidcup
 Mike Rann (1953–), Premier of South Australia, politician, born in Sidcup, lived in Blackfen prior to emigrating to New Zealand with his parents
 John Regis (1966–), Olympic sprinter, lived in Sidcup
 Mark Ricketts (1984–), footballer, born in Sidcup
 Wayne Routledge (1985–), footballer, born in Sidcup
 Gerard Shelley (1891–1980), author, translator and Catholic bishop, born in Sidcup
 Nevil Shute (1899–1960), novelist and aeronautical engineer, lived in Hatherley Road from 1924 to 1930 while working at Vickers in Crayford
 Ethel Smyth (1858–1944), composer and suffragette, born in St. John's Road, Sidcup
 Thomas Townshend, 1st Viscount Sydney (1733–1800), politician and Cabinet minister, lived in Frognal House, Foots Cray
 Gordon Watson (1971–), former Sheffield Wednesday footballer, born in Sidcup
 Elizabeth Wiskemann (1899–1971), historian and journalist, born in Sidcup
 Doug Wright (1914–98), cricketer (Kent and England), born in Sidcup

Fictional residents 
 In the Harold Pinter play The Caretaker, Davies repeatedly says that "all his papers" are in Sidcup, and he will return there, but is "waiting for the weather to break".
 Roderick Spode — fictional politician and fashion designer, was the 7th Earl of Sidcup in the Jeeves stories by P. G. Wodehouse.

References

Bibliography

External links 
 
 Bexley London Borough Council website

 
Districts of the London Borough of Bexley
Areas of London
District centres of London